Area codes 210 and 726 are telephone area codes in the North American Numbering Plan (NANP) in and near San Antonio in the U.S. state of Texas. Area code 210 was created in an area code split from number plan area 512 in 1992. After only a few years, the threat of number exhaustion forced a reduction of the size of the numbering plan area to the center of the San Antonio metropolitan area in 1997. Area code 726 was assigned to the same numbering plan area in an overlay plan activated in 2017 to alleviate the threat of exhaustion that was expected by 2018. Area codes 210 and 726 are enclave codes for an area completely surrounded by numbering plan area 830.

History
Area code 210 was created on November 1, 1992, in a split from area code 512. The new numbering plan area included the San Antonio area, most of the Hill Country, and the Rio Grande Valley. Before 1992, 512 had served the entire south-central portion of Texas since the area code system was instituted by AT&T in 1947; 512 was the last of Texas' original four area codes to be split. Conventional practice would have had San Antonio retaining 512, as it was the largest city. However, state regulators decided to allow Austin, the state capital, to retain 512 in order to spare state agencies the expense and disruption of having to change their numbers.

The 1992 split was intended to be a long-term solution in order to relieve exchanges in the Austin–San Antonio corridor. However, within four years, 210 was already close to exhaustion because of San Antonio's rapid growth and the popularity of cellular telephones and pagers. This forced a three-way split, which took place on July 7, 1997.  Most of Bexar County stayed in 210, while the San Antonio suburbs and the Hill Country were split off as area code 830. The southern portion, centered around the Rio Grande Valley, became area code 956. The 1997 split made San Antonio one of the few cities split between two area codes. Some portions of San Antonio located in Medina and Comal counties, as well as a few portions of Bexar County, are in 830. However, because most of San Antonio and Bexar County are in the 210 area code, "210" has become part of the area's identity and culture.

Amid projections that 210 would exhaust by mid-2018, the Public Utility Commission of Texas approved a new all-service overlay. Planning for that new area code began in June 2015. The new code, 726, was announced in August 2016, and went into effect in October 2017. Public education efforts about the upcoming change commenced in September 2016. Permissive dialing of both seven and ten-digit numbers began in March 2017, and became mandatory in late September of that year.

Area codes 210 and 726 are enclave area codes, similar to area code 312 in Chicago, area code 316 in Wichita, Kansas, area codes 385/801 in Salt Lake City, Utah and 412/878 in Pittsburgh, Pennsylvania, in that it is completely surrounded by area code 830.

Service area
Area codes 210 and 726 serve most of Bexar and small portions of Atascosa, Comal, Guadalupe, Medina, and Wilson counties.

The numbering plan area includes the following cities and towns: Adkins, Alamo Heights, Artesia Wells, Atascosa, Castle Hills, Cibolo, Converse, Ecleto, Elmendorf, Helotes, Kirby, Leon Springs, Macdona, Olmos Park, Saint Hedwig, San Antonio, Shavano Park, Schertz, Terrell Hills, Universal City, Von Ormy, Wetmore, and Windcrest

See also 
 List of Texas area codes

References

External links

List of exchanges for the 210 Area Code

Telecommunications-related introductions in 1992
210
210
San Antonio